Jordan Rudess (born Jordan Charles Rudes; November 4, 1956) is an American musician, software developer and composer best known as a member of the progressive metal band Dream Theater and the progressive metal supergroup Liquid Tension Experiment.

Biography
Jordan Rudess was born in 1956 in Long Island, New York. He was recognized by his 2nd grade teacher for his piano playing and was immediately given professional instruction. At nine, he entered the Juilliard School of Music Pre-College Division for classical piano training, but by his late teens he had grown increasingly interested in synthesizers and progressive rock music, citing his very first experience in the genre as the Hammond playing and distorted stylistic expression of Jon Lord. Against the counsel of his parents and tutors, he turned away from classical piano and tried his hand as a solo progressive rock keyboardist.

When Bleu Ocean was assembling a team of fellow drummers to perform on the song "Bring the Boys Back Home", featured on Pink Floyd's The Wall, he invited Rudess for the sessions, since Rudess had played drums as a child. However, Rudess's performance was rejected by producer Bob Ezrin. At that time, Rudess had already chosen the keyboards as his main instrument.

Rudess was part of a studio project assembled by bubblegum pop impresarios Jerry Kasenetz and Jeffry Katz, who were also behind The Ohio Express and The 1910 Fruitgum Company. In 1980, they tried their hand at album-oriented rock with Speedway Boulevard, which also featured touring members of Ram Jam. The group never performed live, and disbanded shortly after the release of the album.

After performing in various projects during the 1980s, he gained international attention in 1994 when he was voted "Best New Talent" in the Keyboard Magazine readers' poll after the release of his Listen solo album. Two of the bands who took notice of Rudess were The Dixie Dregs and Dream Theater, both of whom invited him to join. Rudess chose the Dregs, primarily as being a part-time member of the band would have less of an impact on his young family, a choice he was not given with Dream Theater.

During his time with the Dregs, Rudess formed a "power duo" with drummer Rod Morgenstein. The genesis of this pairing occurred when a power outage caused all of the Dregs' instruments to fail except Rudess', so he and Morgenstein improvised with each other until power was restored and the concert could continue. The chemistry between the two was so strong during this jam that they decided to perform together on a regular basis (under the name Rudess/Morgenstein Project or later RMP) and have since released a studio and a live record.

Rudess encountered Dream Theater once again when he and Morgenstein secured the support slot on one of Dream Theater's North American tours.

In 1997, when Mike Portnoy was asked to form a supergroup by Magna Carta Records, Rudess was chosen to fill the keyboardist spot in the band, which also consisted of Tony Levin and Portnoy's Dream Theater colleague John Petrucci. During the recording of Liquid Tension Experiment's two albums it became evident to Portnoy and Petrucci that Rudess was what Dream Theater needed. They asked Rudess to join the band, and when he accepted they released their then-keyboardist Derek Sherinian to make way for him.

Rudess has been the full-time keyboardist in Dream Theater since the recording of 1999's Metropolis Pt. 2: Scenes from a Memory. He has recorded ten other studio albums with the group: 2002's Six Degrees of Inner Turbulence, 2003's Train of Thought, 2005's Octavarium, 2007's Systematic Chaos, 2009's Black Clouds & Silver Linings, 2011's A Dramatic Turn of Events, 2013's Dream Theater, 2016's The Astonishing, 2019's Distance over Time, and 2021's A View from the Top of the World. In addition, he has appeared on the live albums Live Scenes From New York, Live at Budokan, Score, Chaos in Motion, Live at Luna Park, Breaking the Fourth Wall and Distant Memories - Live in London.

In addition to working with Dream Theater he occasionally records and performs in other contexts, such as a 2001 one-off duo performance with Petrucci (released as the CD An Evening With John Petrucci and Jordan Rudess), as well as backing up Blackfield on their first short US tour in 2005 and playing a solo opening slot for them on their second in 2007. He also contributed to Steven Wilson's albums Grace for Drowning and Insurgentes.

In 2010, Rudess composed "Explorations for Keyboard and Orchestra," his first classical composition. It was premiered in Caracas, Venezuela, on November 19, 2010 by the Chacao Youth Symphony Orchestra and guest conductor Eren Başbuğ. Rudess played all of the keyboard and synthesizer parts.

On July 28, 2011, in a poll conducted by MusicRadar, Rudess was voted the best keyboardist of all time.

Rudess says his influences as a keyboardist are Keith Emerson, Tony Banks, Rick Wakeman and Patrick Moraz. His favorite musical artists and groups include Gentle Giant, Yes, Genesis, Pink Floyd, Emerson, Lake & Palmer, King Crimson, Jimi Hendrix, Autechre, and Aphex Twin.

Rudess appeared on the Ayreon album, The Theory of Everything released on October 28, 2013.

Use of technology 

While many keyboard players in progressive rock tend towards bringing numerous keyboards on stage, creating large racks of keyboards, Rudess would sample sounds from other keyboards he owned and map them to a single keyboard. Each "setup" assigns different sounds to different layers and key ranges of the keyboard controller; these setups are then arranged in the order they will be required for a gig, and cycled through with a foot switch.

From the 1990s onward, he used a Kurzweil K2600XS during live sets, until switching in 2005 to Korg's Oasys workstation, which he first used on Dream Theater's 2005–2006 20th Anniversary tour, along with a Muse Receptor hardware VST and a Haken Continuum X/Y/Z-plane MIDI instrument triggering a Roland V-Synth XT and a synthesizers.com modular unit designed by Richard Lainhart and Roger Arrick. Influenced by Lainhart, Rudess was the first well known keyboardist to bring a Haken Continuum on to a live stage.
Rudess kept the Kurzweil for studio recordings and some of his signature sounds, such as "the pig", which is often played in unison with the guitar or bass guitar.

In 2011 Rudess switched from the Oasys to the new flagship Korg Kronos. He added a Roland Ax-Edge keytar and a Hammond XK-5 to his live setup in 2019 and were used on Dream Theater's 2019 record Distance over Time. His current live rig consists of the Kronos together with a Continuum, a Hammond XK-5, a Roland AX-Edge, a lap steel guitar, a Harpejji, and an iPad.

Since 2001, Rudess has used custom-made swiveling keyboard stands on stage for both Dream Theater and his solo career, which are built by Patrick Slaats from the Netherlands. On Dream Theater's 2007–2008 "Chaos in Motion Tour", Rudess expanded his live setup with the addition of a Korg RADIAS, a Manikin Memotron,
and a Zen Riffer keytar. Rudess stopped using his Synthesizers.com modular after the European leg of the tour due to its size and weight. Rudess still owns the synthesizer and keeps it in his home studio. During the Progressive Nation 2008 tour, he introduced on the stage a Kaoss Pad 3 for the closing medley.

For the 2009–2010 tour, in support of Black Clouds & Silver Linings, Rudess introduced the Apple iPhone on stage, running an application called Bebot Robot Synth.
Rudess originally used Bebot on the studio recording of "A Rite of Passage". In live performances, he used it on the same song, as well as improvised solos featured in the songs "Hollow Years" and "Solitary Shell".

On September 24, 2010, Rudess released the song "Krump", which was an electronica single, on iTunes. It featured the use of the new Roland Gaia, Roland's more recent keyboard.

Software Development

In 2010, Rudess started a software company called Wizdom Music. He paired with artists such as Kevin Chartier, Felipe Peña and Eyal Amir (from Project RnL), creating new types of musical instrumental user interfaces and experiences, sound synthesis, and new ways of recording and performing music, with tablet computers.

Wizdom Music created the following software: 
 SampleWiz – a touch screen enabled sampler and self sampler for the iPhone and iPad
 MorphWiz – a dynamic touch screen music creation controller for iOS, Android, and Windows 8 enabled touch pads and laptops
 Geo Synthesizer – a new digital music controller interface, for the iPhone and iPad.
 HarmonyWiz - a harmonic analysis and generator tool that can create multi-part harmonies, from tracks either played or manually entered in-app.
 EarWizard - tool to help users recognize the pitch of notes and chords by ear, with progressive difficulty levels.
 GeoShred - guitar simulator app that can be played on a touch screen and allows various parameters of the instrument (e.g., string type, pick position, body type ) to be varied.

Discography

Solo albums
 Arrival (1988)
 Listen (1993)
 Secrets of the Muse (1997)
 Resonance (1999)
 Feeding the Wheel (2001)
 4NYC (2002)
 Christmas Sky (2002)
 Rhythm of Time (2004)
 Prime Cuts (2006, compilation)
 The Road Home (2007, cover album)
 Notes on a Dream (2009)
 All That Is Now (2013)
 Explorations (2014)
 The Unforgotten Path (2015)
 Wired for Madness (2019)
 Heartfelt (2019)
 A Chapter In Time (2021)
 Rockestra (2021)

Dream Theater
 Metropolis Pt. 2: Scenes from a Memory (1999)
 Metropolis 2000: Scenes from New York (2001)
 Live Scenes from New York (2001)
 Six Degrees of Inner Turbulence (2002)
 Train of Thought (2003)
 Live at Budokan (2004)
 Octavarium (2005)
 Score (2006)
 Systematic Chaos (2007)
 Chaos in Motion (2008)
 Black Clouds & Silver Linings (2009)
 A Dramatic Turn of Events (2011)
 Dream Theater (2013)
 Live at Luna Park (2013)
 Breaking the Fourth Wall (2014)
 The Astonishing (2016)
 Distance Over Time (2019)
 Distant Memories - Live in London (2020)
 A View from the Top of the World (2021)

Project albums
 Rudess/Morgenstein Project - Rudess/Morgenstein Project (1997)
 John Petrucci & Jordan Rudess - An Evening with John Petrucci and Jordan Rudess (2000)
 Rudess/Morgenstein Project – The Official Bootleg (2001)
 Levin Minnemann Rudess – Levin Minnemann Rudess (2013)
 Levin Minnemann Rudess - From the Law Offices of Levin Minnemann Rudess (2016)
 Jordan Rudess/Steve Horelick - Intersonic (2017)

Liquid Tension Experiment
 Liquid Tension Experiment (1998)
 Liquid Tension Experiment 2 (1999)
 Spontaneous Combustion (2007, as Liquid Trio Experiment)
 When the Keyboard Breaks: Live in Chicago (2009, as Liquid Trio Experiment 2)
 Liquid Tension Experiment Live 2008 – Limited Edition Boxset (2009)
 Liquid Tension Experiment 3 (2021)

Guest appearances
 Vinnie Moore – Time Odyssey (1988)
 Tom Coster – Did Jah Miss Me? (1989)
 Jan Hammer-Tony Williams - ‘’Montreal Jazz Festival’’ (1991)
 Annie Haslam – Blessing in Disguise (1994)
 Nóirín Ní Riain – Celtic Soul (1996)
 Kip Winger – This Conversation Seems Like A Dream (1997)
 Rhonda Larson – Free as a Bird (1999)
 Jupiter – Jupiter Project (1999)
 Paul Winter and The Earth Band – Journey with the Sun (2000)
 Scott McGill – Addition by Subtraction (2001)
 Prefab Sprout – The Gunman And Other Stories (2001)
 David Bowie – Heathen (2002)
 Jupiter – Echo and Art (2003)
 Neal Morse – ? (2005)
 Daniel J – Losing Time (2005)
 Neil Zaza – When Gravity Fails (2006)
 Behold... the Arctopus – Skullgrid (2007)
 K3 – Under A Spell (2007)
 Ricky Garcia – Let Sleeping Dogs Lie (2008)
 Steven Wilson – Insurgentes (2008–2009)
 Michel Lazaro – Vision (2010)
 Steven Wilson – Grace For Drowning (2011)
 Len & Vani Greene – Luminosity (2011)
 Affector – Harmagedon (2012)
 Sylencer – A Lethal Dose of Truth (2012)
 Mr. Fastfinger – In Motion (2012)
 Lalu – Atomic Ark (2013)
 Ayreon - The Theory of Everything (2013)
 Scream Maker – Livin' in the Past (2014)
 Eyal Amir - "Bad News Jitterbug" (2016)
 Virtual Symmetry - Message From Eternity (2016)
 Alex Lofoco – Beyond (2017)
 Gleb Kolyadin - Gleb Kolyadin (2018)
 The Sea Within - The Sea Within (2018)
 Dewa Budjana - Mahandini (2019)
 Richard Henshall – The Cocoon (2019)
 Nick D'Virgilio – Invisible (2020)
 Virtual Symmetry - Exoverse (2020)
 Mathieu Fiset - One More !!?!?? (2021)
 Alberto Rigoni - Songs for Souls (2022)
 Lalu - Paint the Sky (2022)
 Charlie Griffiths - Tiktaalika (2022)
 Gerald Peter Project - Incremental Changes Pt. 2 (2022)
 Jan Rivera – Existential Paranoia (2022)

References

External links

Jordan's website
Dream Theater's website
Jordan's teaching website

1956 births
Living people
20th-century American keyboardists
21st-century American keyboardists
American electronic musicians
American heavy metal keyboardists
American multi-instrumentalists
American session musicians
Dixie Dregs members
Dream Theater members
Heavy metal keyboardists
Juilliard School alumni
Keytarists
Liquid Tension Experiment members
Magna Carta Records artists
People from Great Neck, New York
Progressive rock keyboardists